QuayCity is a bus service in Tyne and Wear, England, which connects Newcastle Great Park and Wallsend via Gosforth, Jesmond, Newcastle, Quayside, Ouseburn and Walker.

History 
The service was introduced on 26 July 2015, following the merger of existing routes Q2 and X40. It operated under the QuayLink name, with vehicles branded in a two-tone yellow and green livery. 

Initially operating between Great Park and St Peter's Basin, the service was extended to Wallsend on 31 July 2016.

From 21 June 2017, contactless payments were introduced, as part of a trial.

On 14 December 2020, the QuayLink branding was dropped and the route was rebranded QuayCity. A new two-tone yellow and black livery was introduced.

On 27 March 2022, the route was curtailed beyond St Peter's Basin, with services running between Great Park and St Peter's Basin only. On the same date, the route was also amended to run via Jesmond.

On 24 July 2022, the service was renumbered QA & QB, reflecting the direction travelled around Great Park. Changes also saw the link between St Peter's Basin and Wallsend via Walker restored. By September 2022, the service reverted to its previous number, Q3.

Route 

As of September 2022, the service runs up to every 15 minutes during the day (Monday–Saturday) between Great Park and St Peter's Basin, with a half-hourly extension to Wallsend. Services operate half-hourly during the evening and on Sunday between Great Park and St Peter's Basin only.

Fleet and operations
The service is currently operated by a fleet of nine battery electric Yutong E12 single-deck vehicles, branded in a mustard and black variant of the silver-based Voltra livery and carrying over features such as free WiFi, audio-visual next stop announcements and USB charging points specified on previous Voltra buses. These replaced a fleet of nine diesel Optare Versa single-deck vehicles, which were refurbished in December 2020 to Euro VI emissions standard in advance of the launch of Newcastle's Clean Air Zone.

References

External links
 
 Timetable and route map

Bus routes in Tyne and Wear